Kazaki is a rural locality (a selo) in Yeletsky District of Lipetsk Oblast, Russia. Population:  3,395 (2010 Census); 3,256 (2002 Census).

References

Rural localities in Lipetsk Oblast
Yeletsky Uyezd